Baldock services is a motorway service station on the A1(M) motorway near Baldock in Hertfordshire, England. It is operated by Extra. Work on the service area started in March 2000, with the services opening on 22 January 2001.

As well as a hotel, restaurants, shops and a petrol station, Baldock services has facilities for the rapid charging of electric cars, operated under the Ecotricity (Electric Highway) public charging network.

References

External links
Official website
Motorway services online

2001 establishments in England
A1(M) motorway service stations
Buildings and structures in Hertfordshire
Transport in Hertfordshire
Extra motorway service stations
North Hertfordshire District